During the 1996–97 English football season, Luton Town F.C. competed in the Football League Second Division.

Season summary
In the 1996–97 season, Luton started just as badly as the last, with three straight defeats. However, the introduction of young forward Andrew Fotiadis saw Luton burst into life, as they shot up the table with a run of eight wins and two draws in eleven games. Tony Thorpe, too, proved to be a revelation, scoring 28 goals to become the division's top scorer. Luton were nearly promoted, but finished in third place, four points off automatic promotion and then lost to Crewe Alexandra in the play-offs.

Final league table

Results
Luton Town's score comes first

Legend

FA Cup

League Cup

Football League Trophy

Squad

References

Luton Town F.C. seasons
Luton Town